HMS Victor Emmanuel was a screw-propelled 91-gun second-rate ship of the line of the Royal Navy, originally launched as HMS Repulse, but renamed shortly after being launched.

Construction and commissioning
They were re-ordered as screw ships in 1849, and Victor Emmanuel was duly reclassified as a 91-gun ship on 26 March 1852. She was built and launched on 27 February 1855 under the name HMS Repulse, but was renamed Victor Emmanuel on 7 December 1855, in honour of Victor Emmanuel after he visited the ship. She cost a total of £158,086, with £87,597 spent on her hull, and a further £35,588 spent on her machinery.

Career

She served in the English Channel, the Mediterranean, and off the African coast during the Anglo-Ashanti wars. On 4 May 1861, Victor Emmanuel ran aground on the Leufchino Shoal, in the Mediterranean Sea. Repairs cost £69. She was assigned to Hong Kong to replace HMS Princess Charlotte and used as a hospital and receiving ship there from 1873. She was sold in 1899.

Notes

References
 
 Lyon, David and Winfield, Rif, The Sail and Steam Navy List, All the Ships of the Royal Navy 1815-1889, pub Chatham, 2004, 
 Victor Emmanuel's career

External links 
 

 

Ships of the line of the Royal Navy
Victorian-era ships of the line of the United Kingdom
1855 ships
Maritime incidents in May 1861